Donnally Glacier is a glacier about  long in the Churchill Mountains, flowing east along the north side of the Swithinbank Range to enter Starshot Glacier. It was named by the Advisory Committee on Antarctic Names for Commander Edward W. Donnally, U.S. Navy, officer in charge of Naval support personnel at McMurdo Station, winter 1962.

References 

Glaciers of Oates Land